Water board elections were held in the European Netherlands on 15 March 2023 to elect the resident members of the country's water boards.

References 

Water board
Water board elections in the Netherlands